For the Moment is an album by Canadian jazz pianist Renee Rosnes which was released in 1990 by Blue Note Records. It won the 1992 Juno Award for Best Jazz Album.

References 

1990 albums
Juno Award for Best Jazz Album albums
Renee Rosnes albums